Ekwendeni is a town in the Northern Region of Malawi.

In 1889 Walter Angus Elmslie opened a mission station at eKwendeni. It has one of the oldest churches in Malawi belonging to the Church of Central Africa Presbyterian (CCAP), the local equivalent of the Church of Scotland.

The general hospital began in the 1890s as a ministry of the Free Church of Scotland. Ekwendeni Hospital is operated by the Church of Central Africa Presbyterian – Synod of Livingstonia, in partnership with the Presbyterian Church (USA), the Church of Scotland and the Presbyterian Church of Ireland.

The people of Ekwendeni have Tumbuka as the dominant language but other languages are spoken due to the high numbers of people from other parts of Malawi settling there. Residents of Ekwendeni were often attracted there because of the hospital, the theological college, the college of nursing and the technical training school.

Ekwendeni is largely surrounded by tobacco growing farms. It has a high HIV/AIDS prevalence rates as a favourite resting place for truck drivers travelling along the M1 road between Malawi and Tanzania, Kenya and beyond.

Ekwendeni is booming with small businesses. International donors are helping in the development of this area. The town has beautiful surroundings which make the area a good destination for tourists.

References

External links

Populated places in Northern Region, Malawi